The Minister of State for Food, Farming and Fisheries is a mid-level position in the Department for Environment, Food and Rural Affairs in the British government. It is currently held by Mark Spencer, who took office on 7 September 2022.

Responsibilities
Responsibilities include:

Overall lead Minister for the agri-food chain, and lead Minister for the Union and Levelling Up relating to Defra issues
Lead for Rural Payments Agency, Animal Health Development Board, Fera, Centre for Environment, Fisheries and Aquaculture, Marine Management Organisation and relationship with the Food Standards Agency
Fisheries
Farming
Food
Trade
Pesticides

Ministers for Agriculture and Food

References

Department for Environment, Food and Rural Affairs
Ministerial offices in the United Kingdom